The Olympus OM-D series is a series of Micro Four Thirds digital Mirrorless Interchangeable Lens Cameras started by Olympus Corporation. Olympus' camera division was acquired by Japan Industrial Partners in 2021 and they will continue the OM-D series in the future.

It is the resuscitation of the OM series from the 1970s and 1980s, implementing the same kind of design language, but equipped with technology that meets the standards of the 2010s, like a digital image sensor or video recording capabilities.

The OM-D series is currently the highest-end line of Olympus cameras, categorized above PEN mirrorless and Stylus point and shoot cameras.

Differences between a PEN and an OM-D camera (Micro Four Thirds) 

 The PEN series is smaller and lighter by average.
 Most PEN cameras have less features than the OM-D cameras.
 Every OM-D camera has a built-in electronic viewfinder, in the PEN there is only one model with it (PEN F).
 Every OM-D camera has a flash hot shoe, whereas not all PEN cameras have one.
 Most PEN cameras have a 3 axis sensor stabilization system, whereas every OM-D has a 5 axis one, with one exception (E-M10).
 The PEN series has a "rangefinder-style" body (flat top), whereas the OM-D series has an "SLR-style" body (bump on the top).
 Usually the OM-D line is higher-end and more expensive than the PEN line.

The difference between the OM-D models 
There are three main categories in the OM-D series:

 E-M10  
 The lowest-end OM-D category.
 Beginner-friendly design.
 Built-in flash.
 Least expensive.
 In absolute terms, a mid-range line.
Newest model: E-M10 Mark IV.
 E-M5
 Mid-tier in the OM-D family.
 Made for enthusiasts.
 Weather resistance.
 Moderately expensive.
 In absolute terms, a high mid-range line.
Newest model: E-M5 Mark III.
 E-M1
 The highest-end OM-D category.
 Professional design and professional features.
 Large grip.
 Most expensive.
Advanced video features.
 In absolute terms, a professional line.
Newest model: E-M1 Mark III.
E-M1X
Highest-end OM-D camera based on the E-M1 Mark II, introduced in 2018.
Built-in vertical grip.
Very ergonomic handling and button layout.
Very large EVF magnification.
Almost twice as heavy as the E-M1 II.
Long battery life.

The main difference between them is the ergonomics and the customizability. Most of the features are present all across the OM-D family, but the handling, the durability, and the accessibility of the features differ in favour of the more expensive categories.

Every OM-D series camera and their basic information